The 12th Panzer Division (German: 12. Panzerdivision) was a West German armoured formation. It was part of the III Corps of the Bundeswehr, which also incorporated in 1985 the 5th Panzer Division and 2nd Panzergrenadier Division. III Corps was part of NATO's Central Army Group (CENTAG), along with the Bundeswehr's II Corps and the American V and VII Corps. In the wake of military restructuring brought about by the end of the Cold War, the 12th Panzer Division was disbanded in 1994.

The division was constituted as the 12th Panzergrenadier Division in Tauberbischofsheim on January 1, 1961, as part of the II Corps of the Bundeswehr. At that time, it commanded the 35th Panzergrenadier Brigade, and in 1963 the 36th Panzer Brigade was also subordinated to the division. Subsequently, the 12th was re-designated a panzer (armoured) division. In 1970, the division was relieved from assignment to the II Corps and assigned to the III Corps. A third active brigade was not authorized for the division until 1975 during the "Heeresstruktur III" reforms. By 1977, the division's main components were the 14th Panzer, the 35th Panzergrenadier, and the 36th Panzer Brigades. In 1981, the 14th Panzer Brigade became the 34th Panzer Brigade.

Following the end of the Cold War, the 12th Panzer Division was disbanded in 1994.

Commanders

References

Military units and formations established in 1961
Military units and formations disestablished in 1994
Armoured divisions of the Bundeswehr